Lai Man Fei (born 10 December 1988 in Hong Kong) is a former Hong Kong professional football player. His usual position is
central defender.

Club career

South China
Lai joined South China's reserve team in 2006 and was promoted to the first team in the next year. However, before the start of the 2007-08 season, he was sent to Japan together with Chan Ka Chun for overseas training with the U-19 team of Yokohama F. Marinos, the guest team of BMA Cup organized by South China in early 2007. 
He made his debut for the South China first squad as a substitute coming up in South China's first AFC Cup match on 11 March 2008 against Home United from Singapore.

Honour
Hong Kong
2009 East Asian Games Football Event: Gold

Career statistics

Club
As of 3 August 2009

External links
  Player Information on scaafc.com
  Yahoo! Blog
  BMA Football Star

1988 births
Living people
Hong Kong footballers
Association football defenders
Hong Kong First Division League players
South China AA players
TSW Pegasus FC players
Yuen Long FC players
Hong Kong international footballers
Footballers at the 2010 Asian Games
Asian Games competitors for Hong Kong